Give a Paw, Friend! is a 1967 Soviet family film directed by Ilya Gurin.

Plot 
The film tells about a girl, a girl, Tanya, and her faithful dog, nicknamed Friend, who always comes to her aid and does not leave her when she gets sick...

Cast 
 Olga Bobkova
 Valentina Belyaeva	
 Nikolay Lebedev
 Yuriy Sarantsev
 Aleksandr Sokolov
 Lev Lyubetskiy
 Aleksei Smirnov
 Varvara Shurkhovetskaya

References

External links 
 

1967 films
1960s Russian-language films
Soviet children's films